Finland competed at the 2019 Winter Deaflympics held between 12 and 21 December 2019 in Province of Sondrio in Northern Italy. The country won two silver medals and one bronze medal and the country finished in 10th place in the medal table.

Medalists

Curling 

Finland won the bronze medal in the men's tournament.

Ice hockey 

Finland competed in the ice hockey tournament and they lost their bronze medal match against Russia.

Snowboarding 

Cecilia Hanhikoski won the silver medal in the women's parallel giant slalom event and in the women's parallel slalom event.

References 

Winter Deaflympics
Nations at the 2019 Winter Deaflympics